StatMuse Inc. is an American artificial intelligence company founded in 2014. The company maintains its own eponymous website where it hosts a database of sports statistics.

History
Two friends founded the company in 2014. As a startup, the company's goal was to utilize a type of artificial intelligence called natural language processing (NLP) for sports. In 2015, the company was part of the second group of startups accepted into the Disney Accelerator program. The company ultimately received the backing of The Walt Disney Company, Techstars, Allen & Company, the NFL Players Association, Greycroft and NBA Commissioner David Stern. 

Initially, the company only had stats available for the National Basketball Association (NBA), but eventually expanded to provide stats for the other major North American sports leagues. The company launched its phone app in September 2017. Through the app, users can query StatMuse's sports statistics database using their own natural language. Upon its launch, Fitz Tepper of TechCrunch wrote that: "The technology isn't perfect – some of the pauses between words are a bit awkward – making it clear that some phrases is being stitched together on the fly. But this is the exception, and on the whole most responses sound pretty good."

Notes

References

2014 establishments in California
American companies established in 2014
Analytics companies
American sport websites
Companies based in San Francisco
Data companies
Online companies of the United States
Internet properties established in 2014
Sports records and statistics
Chatbots
Natural language processing